Mikael Tjälldén (February 16, 1975) is a Swedish retired professional ice hockey defenceman who played throughout Europe and in North American minor leagues.

Career
As a junior player, Tjälldén represented Ångermanland in the 1990 TV-Pucken. Ångermanland won the silver medal, losing to Skåne  in the final.

Tjälldén began his professional career in 1990 with home town club Sollefteå HK in Division 1, whilst also playing Junior hockey for Modo. Following the culmination of the 1992-93 season, Tjälldén was selected in the 1993 NHL Entry Draft, 67th overall by the Florida Panthers. Tjälldén then moved to Timrå IK, also of Division 1, where he played for 3 seasons. Following his time in Timrå, for the 1996-97 season Tjälldén moved up to the SHL and played for Västra Frölunda HC.

Tjälldén moved to North America for the 1997-98 season to play for the Panthers ECHL affiliate team, the Tallahassee Tiger Sharks. During this season, he also dressed 3 times for the Syracuse Crunch of the AHL. Following his year in North America, Tjälldén returned to Europe this time playing for SM-Liiga outfit Lukko in Finland, as well as Italian Serie A side Asiago.

Tjälldén then moved to the United Kingdom in order to play for the Newcastle Riverkings of the BISL for the 1999-00 season. Tjälldén would stay in the UK for the following season, dressing for the London Knights of the same league. Tjälldén then returned to Sweden to play for Skellefteå AIK in the Allsvenskan for the 2001-02 season.

Tjälldén then moved to Norway to compete for Eliteserien side Storhamar. He would go on to play for the team for 4 years, winning the Eliteserien during the 2002-03 season. On December 13, 2005 whilst playing for Storhamar against Vålerenga, Tjälldén was hit by Aleksander Nervik which resulted in Tjälldén's helmet coming off. Tjälldén then fell, hitting his head on the ice, suffering a fractured skull and a brain bleed. Nervik was suspended for 4 games as a result of the hit. The incident effectively ended Tjälldén's hockey career.

International
Tjälldén represented Sweden in the 1993 IIHF European Junior Championships, and helped the team win gold with 5 assists in 6 games.

Career Statistics

Regular Season and Playoffs

References

External links

1975 births
Swedish ice hockey players
London Knights (UK) players
Syracuse Crunch players
Tallahassee Tiger Sharks players
Newcastle Riverkings players
People from Sollefteå Municipality
Asiago Hockey 1935 players
Storhamar Dragons players
Timrå IK players
Skellefteå AIK players
Lukko players
Frölunda HC players
Swedish expatriate ice hockey players in the United States
Swedish expatriate ice hockey players in Finland
Swedish expatriate sportspeople in Italy
Swedish expatriate sportspeople in England
Swedish expatriate ice hockey players in Norway
Living people
Sportspeople from Västernorrland County